Bihar, a state of India, has airports which have access to international flights, domestic and some non used airstrips for emergency purposes. All the airports in Bihar are operated by Airports Authority of India.

List 
The list includes the domestic, military and nonoperational airports with their respective ICAO and IATA codes.

References

Bihar
Airports
Airports in Bihar
Buildings and structures in Bihar